Münster is a village situated in the municipality of Goms, Canton of Valais in Switzerland, at the river Rhône or Rotten.

Villages in Valais